Arthur Atta (born 14 January 2003) is a professional footballer who plays as a defensive midfielder for Metz.

Club career
Atta is a youth product of AS Saint Jacques, Rennes and Metz. As a youth he played as goalkeeper, winger and forward, before moving back to play as defensive midfielder. He was promoted to Metz's reserves in 2021. He made his professional debut with Metz in a 0–0 Ligue 2 tie with Niort on 26 December 2022, where he was named man of the match. On 25 January 2023, he signed his first professional contract with Metz until 2026.

Personal life
Born in France, Atta is of Beninese descent.

References

External links
 
 

2003 births
Living people
Footballers from Rennes
French footballers
French sportspeople of Beninese descent
Association football midfielders
FC Metz players
Ligue 2 players
Championnat National 2 players